{{Infobox person
| name               = Orlando Fortunato de Oliveira
| image              = 
| imagesize          = 
| alt                = 
| caption            = 
| birth_name         = 
| birth_date         = March 20, 1946
| birth_place        =Benguela
| death_date         = 
| death_place        = 
| notable_works      = 
|known_for    = Comboio de Canhoca (The Train of Cahoca) 
| awards             =  
| othername          = 
| occupation         = 
| yearsactive        = 1989 - Present
| party              = 
| spouse                = 
| alma_mater         =  Catholic University of America
| children              = 
| nationality        = Angolan
| citizenship        = Angolan
| mother             =
| father             = 
| website            = 
}}
Orlando Fortunato de Oliveira (born 1946) is an Angolan film director.

Life
Orlando Fortunato de Oliveira was born on March 20, 1946, in Benguela. He studied sciences and geophysics at the Catholic University of America before turning to cinema.

He filmed Comboio de Canhoca (The Train of Cahoca) in 1989, though for political reasons the film was not released until 2004. In the film, based on a real-life colonial atrocity in the 1950s, Portuguese secret police arrest 59 Angolans, placing them in a train boxcar which is left on a rail siding for three days. As the heat increases, the solidarity of the prisoners break down and they suffer asphyxiation.

Filmography
 Um Caso Nosso [Our case], 1978
 Memoria de um Dia [Memory of a day], 1982
 Festa d’Ilha [Island party], 1985
 Agostinho Neto, 2000
 Comboio de Canhoca [The Train of Canhoca], 2004.
 Batepá'' [Batter], 2010

References

External links
 

1946 births
Living people
Angolan film directors